In paleontology, a Lazarus taxon (plural taxa) is a taxon that disappears for one or more periods from the fossil record, only to appear again later. Likewise in conservation biology and ecology, it can refer to species or populations that were thought to be extinct, and are rediscovered. The term Lazarus taxon was coined by Karl W. Flessa & David Jablonski in 1983 and was then expanded by Jablonski in 1986. Paul Wignall and Michael Benton defined Lazarus taxa as, "At times of biotic crisis many taxa go extinct, but others only temporarily disappeared from the fossil record, often for intervals measured in millions of years, before reappearing unchanged". Earlier work also supports the concept though without using the name Lazarus taxon, like work by Christopher R. C. Paul.

The term refers to the story in the Christian biblical Gospel of John, in which Jesus Christ raised Lazarus from the dead.

Potential explanations 
Lazarus taxa are observational artifacts that appear to occur either because of (local) extinction, later resupplied, or as a sampling artifact. The fossil record is inherently sporadic (only a very small fraction of organisms become fossilized, and an even smaller fraction are discovered before destruction) and contains gaps not necessarily caused by extinction, particularly when the number of individuals in a taxon is very low.

After mass extinctions, such as the Permian–Triassic extinction event, the Lazarus effect occurred for many taxa. However, there appears to be no link with the abundance of fossiliferous sites and the proportion of Lazarus taxa, and no missing taxa have been found in potential refuges. Therefore, reappearance of Lazarus taxa probably reflects the rebound after a period of extreme rarity during the aftermath of such extinctions.

Related but distinct concepts 
An Elvis taxon is a look-alike that has supplanted an extinct taxon through convergent evolution.

A zombie taxon is a taxon that contains specimens that have been collected from strata younger than the extinction of the taxon. Later such fossils turn out to be freed from the original seam and refossilized in a younger sediment. For example, a trilobite that gets eroded out of its Cambrian-aged limestone matrix, and reworked into Miocene-aged siltstone.

A living fossil is an extant taxon that appears to have changed so little compared with fossil remains, that it is considered identical. Living fossils may occur regularly in the fossil record, such as the lampshell Lingula, though the living species in this genus are not identical to fossil brachiopods.

Other living fossils however are also Lazarus taxa if these have been missing from the fossil record for substantial periods of time, such as applies for coelacanths.

Finally, the term "Lazarus species" is applied to organisms that have been rediscovered as being still alive after having been widely considered extinct for years, without ever having appeared in the fossil record. In this last case, the term Lazarus taxon is applied in neontology.

Reappearing fossil taxa 

Bush dog (Speothos venaticus), last surviving species of the genus Speothos; first described as an extinct taxon in 1842 by Peter Wilhelm Lund, based on fossils uncovered from Brazilian caves; Lund found and described living specimens in 1843 without realizing they were of the same species as the fossils, dubbing the living bush dogs as members of the genus "Icticyon"; this was not corrected until some time in the 20th century.
Chacoan peccary (Catagonus wagneri), last surviving species of the genus Catagonus; believed to be the closest living relative to the extinct genus Platygonus. First described as extinct in 1930 as fossils; live specimens found in 1974.
 Coelacanth (Latimeria), a member of a subclass (Actinistia) thought to have gone extinct 66 million years ago; live specimens found in 1938.
 False killer whale, first described by the British paleontologist and biologist Richard Owen based on a skull discovered in 1843 found in Stamford, Lincolnshire in England and dated to the Middle Pleistocene around 126,000 years ago. The first carcasses washed up on the shores of Kiel Bay in Denmark in 1861; until this point the species was thought to be extinct.
 Nightcap oak (Eidothea hardeniana and Eidothea zoexylocarya), representing a genus previously known only from fossils 15 to 20 million years old, were recognized in 2000 and 1995, respectively.
 Gracilidris, a genus of dolichoderine ants thought to have gone extinct 15–20 million years ago was found in Paraguay, Brazil, and Argentina and redescribed in 2006.
 Alavesia, a genus of Atelestid fly, originally discovered as a fossil in amber over 100 million years old in 1999, living species found in Namibia in 2010.
Laotian rock rat (Laonastes aenigmamus), a member of a family (Diatomyidae) thought to have gone extinct 11 million years ago; found in 1996.
 The arboreal chinchilla rats (Cuscomys spp.), which were originally described based on a single species (Cuscomys oblativus) known only from archaeological remains discovered in ancient Inca tombs described in 1912 and believed to be extinct for almost a century. A second species (Cuscomys ashaninka) was discovered alive in Peru in 1999, and photographs taken at Machu Picchu in 2009 suggest that C. oblativus is still alive as well.
 Majorcan midwife toad (Alytes muletensis), in the family Alytidae, described from fossil remains in 1977, discovered alive in 1979.
 Dawn redwood (Metasequoia), a genus of conifer, described as a fossil in 1941, rediscovered alive in 1944.
 Monito del monte (Dromiciops), sole surviving member of the order Microbiotheria; first described in 1894, thought to have gone extinct 11 million years ago.
 Bulmer's fruit bat (Aproteles bulmerae), originally described from a Pleistocene garbage pile, it was subsequently discovered alive elsewhere in its native New Guinea.

 Monoplacophora, a class of molluscs believed to have gone extinct in the middle Devonian Period (c. 380 million years ago) until living members were discovered in deep water off Costa Rica in 1952.
 Mountain pygmy possum (Burramys parvus), first discovered in the fossil record in 1895; rediscovered alive in 1966.
 Schinderhannes bartelsi, a Devonian member of the order Radiodonta, previously known only from Cambrian fossils, 100 million years earlier.
Submyotodon, a genus of bat originally known from a single fossil species (S. petersbuchensis) described in 2003 from the Miocene of Germany, about 11 to 16 million years ago. In 2015, a phylogenetic analysis of bats from Taiwan and China found three species previously classified in Myotis (M. caliginosus, M. latirostris, and M. moupinensis) to be wholly distinct from any other member of Myotis, and instead more closely allied to the fossil Submyotodon, and thus reclassified them in Submyotodon, making the genus extant once more.
 Wollemi pine (Wollemia), a genus of coniferous tree in the family Araucariaceae; previously known only from fossils from 2 to 90 million years ago, rediscovered in 1994.
Calliostoma bullatum, a species of deepwater sea snail; originally described in 1844 from fossil specimens in deep-water coral-related sediments from southern Italy, until extant individuals were described in 2019 from deep-water coral reefs off the coast of Mauritania.
Cymatioa cookae, a small bivalve mollusk of family Galeommatidae; originally documented in 1937 from Pleistocene fossil specimens near Los Angeles, then living specimens discovered in 2018 on the coast of Santa Barbara.

Reappearing IUCN red list species

Plants

 Afrothismia pachyantha, in the family Burmanniaceae; first discovered in 1905, rediscovered in 1995.
 Antirhea tomentosa, in the family Rubiaceae; first discovered in 1780, rediscovered in 1975.
 Asplundia clementinae, a species of plant in the family Cyclanthaceae.
 Astragalus nitidiflorus
 Badula platyphylla, a species of plant in the family Primulaceae.
 Blunt chaff flower (Achyranthes mutica), a species of plant in the family Amaranthaceae.
 Bulbophyllum filiforme, a species of epiphytic plant in the family Orchidaceae; first botanically described in 1895.
 Bulbostylis neglecta, an endemic member of the family Cyperaceae; first collected in 1806, rediscovered in 2008.
 Café marron (Ramosmania rodriguesii), thought extinct in the 1950s but rediscovered in 1980.
 Camellia piquetiana, in the family Theaceae; discovered in the 19th century, rediscovered in 2003.
 Climbing alsinidendron (Alsinidendron viscosum), in the family Caryophyllaceae.
 Coffea stenophylla
 Cyanea dunbariae, in the bellflower family; rediscovered in 1992.
 Cyanea kuhihewa
 Cyanea procera, in the bellflower family.
 Pygmy goosefoot (Dysphania pusilla), thought extinct since 1959, but rediscovered in 2015.
 Eidothea hardeniana (Nightcap oak)
 Eugenia bojeri, a species of plant in the family Myrtaceae.
 Euphrasia arguta, a plant from the genus Euphrasia, in the family Orobanchaceae; thought extinct since 1904, rediscovered 2008.
 Franciscan manzanita (Arctostaphylos hookeri), thought to be extinct in the wild since 1942, rediscovered in 2009.
 Furbish's lousewort (Pedicularis furbishiae), Canadian species identified as an extinct species in 1880, rediscovered in the 1970s.
 Hibiscadelphus woodii, a species of flowering plant in the family Malvaceae, declared extinct in 2016 and rediscovered three years later.
 Jellyfish tree (Medusagyne oppositifolia), the only member of the genus Medusagyne, of the family Ochnaceae; thought extinct until 1970.
 Mammillaria schwarzii, a species of plant in the family Cactaceae; thought to be extinct for some time, until rediscovered in 1987.
 Ligusticum albanicum
 Medemia argun in the family Arecaceae, it is the only species in the genus Medemia.
 Metasequoia (Dawn redwood)
 Mount Diablo buckwheat (Eriogonom truncatum), in the family Polygonaceae; thought to be extinct around 1935 but found again in 2005, then again in 2016.
 Madhuca diplostemon, a tree in the family Sapotaceae; first collected in 1835, rediscovered in 2019.
 Pittosporum tanianum, a species of plant in the family Pittosporaceae.
 Ranunculus mutinensis
 Rhaphidospora cavernarum, a plant species in the family Acanthaceae; thought to be extinct since 1873 but relocated in 2008.
 She cabbage tree (Lachanodes arborea) a small tree in the family Asteraceae.
 Sicilian fir (Abies nebrodensis), in the family Pinaceae.
 Takhtajania perrieri, a genus of flowering plants in the family Winteraceae; first collected in 1909, rediscovered and reclassified multiple times between 1963–1997.
 Turbinicarpus gielsdorfianus, a species of plant in the family Cactaceae.
 Virginia round-leaf birch (Betula uber), a rare species of tree in the birch family; first discovered in 1914, thought to be extinct until 1975
 Yellow fatu (Abutilon pitcairnense), a species of plant in the family Malvaceae. The plant was once considered extinct until 2003.

Cultivars
 Judean date palm, found as a seed dated from between 155 BC to 64 AD, replanted in 2005.
 Montreal melon, a common plant in the 19th century that disappeared but was rediscovered after a couple of generations in 1996.

Sponges
 Neptune's Cup (Cliona patera), a species of demosponge in the family Clionaidae; thought to be extinct from overharvesting in 1908, rediscovered in 2011.

Annelids
 Giant Palouse earthworm (Driloleirus americanus), a species of earthworm belonging to the genus Driloleirus; thought extinct in the 1980s, but found again in 2006.

Insects
 Lord Howe Island stick insect (Dryococelus australis); a species of stick insect in the family Phasmatodae; thought to be extinct by 1930, rediscovered in 2001.
 Canterbury knobbed weevil (Hadramphus tuberculatus), in the family Curculionidae; first discovered in 1877, last seen in 1922 until it was rediscovered in 2004.
 The cloaked bee (Pharohylaeus lactiferus); a bee in the subfamily Hylaeinae which had not been found since 1923 and was rediscovered in 2018.
 Lestes patricia, a species of damselfly discovered in 1924. Only a single male specimen was collected during the discovery. The species was left unseen until 2020 where a colony of them was rediscovered.
 Megachile pluto, the world's largest bee. Not seen after 1858, when it was first collected, until it was rediscovered in 1981.
 Dinosaur ant (Nothomyrmecia macrops), a rare genus of ants consisting of a single species, discovered in 1931, not seen again until 1977.
 Petasida ephippigera, a species of grasshopper in the family Pyrgomorphidae; thought to be extinct from 1900 until 1971, when a single male specimen was spotted, followed by a breeding pair shortly afterwards.
 Schizodactylus inexspectatus, a dune-inhabiting cricket from Turkey, known from a single specimen seen in 1901 and presumed extinct until it was found again in 2005.
 Bone skipper fly (Thyreophora cynophila), in the family Piophilidae; first described (1794) and last seen in Central Europe (1850), before being photographed in Spain in 2009.
 Pitt Island longhorn beetle (Xylotoles costatus), is a species of beetle in the family Cerambycidae; last seen on Pitt Island in 1910, and found again on a nearby island in the Chatham Islands in 1987.

Crustaceans
 Short-tailed rain crayfish (Ombrastacoides parvicaudatus)

Arachnids 
 Alopecosa fabrilis

Fish 
 Batman River Loach, a loach species not seen since 1970s. Rediscovered in 2021.
 Black kokanee (Oncorhynchus nerka kawamurae), a Japanese species of salmon in the family Salmonidae; believed extinct in 1940 after attempts at conservation seemingly failed. The species was rediscovered in Lake Saiko in 2010, having survived after prior conservation efforts had introduced it there.

Shark 
 Smoothtooth blacktip shark (Carcharhinus leiodon), a species of requiem shark, in the family Carcharhinidae; known only from a specimen caught in 1902, the shark was rediscovered at a fish market in 2008.
 Pondicherry shark
 Whitetip weasel shark
 Flapnose houndshark
 Ornate sleeper-ray

Amphibians 

 Armoured frog (Litoria lorica), a species of frog in the family Hylidae; first discovered in 1976, until its rediscovery in 2008. 
 Ansonia latidisca (Sambas stream toad, Borneo rainbow toad) in the family Bufonidae; first discovered in 1924, until its rediscovery in 2011.
 Starry night toad (Atelopus arsyecue), not seen for over 30 years until rediscovery in 2019.
 Painted frog (Atelopus ebenoides marinkellei), a species of true toad in the family Bufonidae, believed to be extinct since 1995, until it was rediscovered in 2006.
 Atelopus ignescens (Jambato toad, Quito stubfoot toad), a species of toad in the family Bufonidae; thought to be extinct since its last recorded sighting in 1988, until its rediscovery in 2016.
 Atelopus laetissimus, a species of toad in the family Bufonidae.
 Atelopus longirostris
 Mindo harlequin frog (Atelopus mindoensis)
 San Lorenzo harlequin frog (Atelopus nahumae), a species of toad in the family Bufonidae.
 Atelopus varius a toad endemic to the Talamancan montane forests, between Costa Rica and Panama.
 Booroolong frog (Ranoidea booroolongensis)
 Hula painted frog (Discoglossus nigriventer), the only living member of the genus Latonia; thought to be extinct in the 1950s, until it was rediscovered in 2011.
 American cinchona plantation treefrog (Isthmohyla rivularis), a rare species of frog in the family Hylidae; thought to have become extinct, until its rediscovery in 2007.
 Bolivian Cochran frog (Nymphargus bejaranoi), not seen for over 18 years until its rediscovery in early 2020.
 Black jumping salamander (Ixalotriton niger), a species of salamander in the family Plethodontidae; believed to be extinct, until rediscovered in 2000 and again in 2006 and 2007.
 Confusing rocket frog (Ectopoglossus confusus), thought to be extinct in 1989 until it was rediscovered in 2016. 
 Large-crested toad (Incilius cristatus), a critically endangered species of true toad in the family Bufonidae.
 Majorcan midwife toad (Alytes muletensis)
 Taudactylus rheophilus (northern tinker frog, tinkling frog), a species of frog in the family Myobatrachidae.
 Philautus chalazodes (chalazodes bubble-nest frog, white-spotted bush frog or Günther's bush frog), a species of frog in the family Rhacophoridae; no verifiable reports of this species, until its rediscovery in 2011.
 Guttman's Stream frog (Pulchrana guttmani)
 Sumatra toad (Bufo sumatranus), a species of toad in the family Bufonidae.
 Telmatobufo venustus, a species of frog in the family Calyptocephalellidae, not seen from 1899 until 1999.
 Thorius minutissimus, a species of salamander in the family Plethodontidae.

Mammals

 Bavarian pine vole (Microtus bavaricus), is a vole in the family Cricetidae; believed extinct in the 1960s, until it was rediscovered in 2000.
Black-footed ferret (Mustela nigripes), a North American species presumed extinct in 1979 until it was rediscovered in 1981. A captive breeding program of the discovered ferrets successfully reintroduced the species into the wild.
 Brazilian arboreal mouse (Rhagomys rufescens), a South American rodent species of the family Cricetidae; first described in 1886, was believed to be extinct for over one hundred years.
 Bouvier's red colobus (Piliocolobus bouvieri), a species of colobus monkey rediscovered in 2015.
  Onychogalea fraenata (Bridled nail-tail wallaby, bridled nail-tailed wallaby, bridled nailtail wallaby, bridled wallaby, merrin or flashjack), a vulnerable species of macropod; thought to be extinct since the last confirmed sighting in 1937, but rediscovered in 1973.
Caspian horse (Khazar horse), thought to be descended from Mesopotamian horses; remains dating back to 3400 B.C.E, but it was rediscovered in the 1960s.
 Zyzomys pedunculatus (central rock rat, central thick-tailed rock-rat, Macdonnell Range rock-rat, Australian native mouse, rat à grosse queue or rata coligorda), a species of rodent in the family Muridae; thought to be extinct in 1990 and 1994, until a reappearance in 2001 and in 2002, then the species went unrecorded until 2013.
 Cuban solenodon (Atopogale cubana), thought to have been extinct until a live specimen was found in 2003.
 Dinagat bushy-tailed cloud rat, assumed extinct after discovery in 1974, but rediscovered in 2012.
 Eastern black crested gibbon
 Fernandina rice rat (Nesoryzomys fernandinae), thought extinct in 1996 (last seen 1980) but found again in the late 1990s.
 Gilbert's potoroo (Potorous gilbertii), extremely rare Australian mammal presumed extinct from the 19th century until 1994.
 Gould's mouse (Pseudomys gouldii)
 Humboldt marten (Martes caurina humboldtensis), subspecies of the Pacific marten thought to be extinct until rediscovered in 1996 on remote camera traps in the Six Rivers National Forest in northern California.
 Julia Creek dunnart (Sminthopsis douglasi), thought to be extinct until it was rediscovered in the 1990s.
 Miller's langur (Presbytis canicrus), presumed extinct 2004, rediscovered 2012.
 Leadbeater's possum (Gymnobelideus leadbeateri), thought to be extinct until 1965.
 Machu Picchu arboreal chinchilla rat (Cuscomys oblativus), believed extinct since the 1400s or 1500s, but rediscovered in 2009 near Machu Picchu in Peru.
 Mahogany glider (Petaurus gracilis), described in 1883 and not recorded between 1886 and 1973. An expedition by the Queensland Museum in 1989 found a living population.
 New Guinea big-eared bat (Pharotis imogene), previously, the species was believed to have been extinct since 1890, when it was last spotted. In 2012, researchers realised that a female bat collected near Kamali was a member of this species.
 New Holland mouse (Pseudomys novaehollandiae), described by George Waterhouse in 1843, it was re-discovered in Ku-ring-gai Chase National Park, North of Sydney, in 1967.
 Philippine naked-backed fruit bat (Dobsonia chapmani), in 1996 the species was declared extinct by the IUCN, as none had been sighted since 1964, but the bat was rediscovered in 2000.
Pinatubo volcano mouse
 Roosevelt's muntjac (Muntiacus rooseveltorum), it was re-discovered in Xuan Lien Nature Reserve in Vietnam's Thanh Hoa province in 2014.
San Quintin kangaroo rat (Dipodoys gravipes), previously seen in 1986, feared extinct until rediscovery in 2017.
 Santiago Galápagos mouse (Nesoryzomys swarthi), thought extinct and last recorded in 1906, but was rediscovered in 1997.
 Short-footed Luzon tree rat (Carpomys melanurus), believed extinct since 1896, but rediscovered in 2008 on Mount Pulag in northern Luzon.
 Tammar wallaby (Macropus eugenii), the mainland Australian subspecies was presumed extinct from 1925 until genetically matched with invasive wallabies in New Zealand in 1998.
Vietnam mouse-deer (Tragulus versicolor), last known from a specimen acquired from hunters in 1990, not seen again for nearly 30 years until multiple individuals were sighted with camera-trap photographs in a 2019 survey of prospective habitat.
 Woolly flying squirrel (Eupetaurus cinereus), known only from pelts collected in Pakistan in the late 19th century, until live specimens were collected in the 1990s.
 Wimmer's shrew (Crocidura wimmeri), believed extinct since 1976, but rediscovered in 2012 in Côte d'Ivoire.
 Yellow-tailed woolly monkey (Lagothrix flavicauda), first described from furs in 1812, live specimens not discovered until 1926.

Reptiles

 Albany adder (Bitis albanica), rediscovered in 2016.
 Arakan forest turtle (Heosemys depressa), last seen in 1908 but found again in 1994.
 Cropan's boa (Corallus cropanii), endemic to the endangered Atlantic forest ecosystem of Brazil, rediscovered in 2017.
 Cupola gecko (Mokopirirakau cupola)
 El Hierro giant lizard (Gallotia simonyi), rediscovered in 1974.
 Erythrolamprus ornatus
 Gray's monitor (Varanus olivaceus), described in 1845, and not seen again by scientists for 130 years.
 La Gomera giant lizard (Gallotia bravoana), rediscovered in 1999.
 La Palma giant lizard (Gallotia auaritae), thought to have been extinct since 1500, but rediscovered in 2007.
 New Caledonian crested gecko (Correlophus ciliatus) rediscovered in 1994. 
 Rio Apaporis caiman
 Short-nosed sea snake (Aipysurus apraefrontalis), rediscovered in 2015, after parting with their original habitat of the Ashmore and Cartier Islands for unknown reasons.
 Terror skink (Phoboscincus bocourti), a 50-cm-long lizard, was previously known from a single specimen captured around 1870 and was long presumed extinct. In 2003, on a tiny islet, it was rediscovered.
 Southern river terrapin (Batagur affinis)
 Fernandina Island Galápagos tortoise (Chelonoidis phantasticus), only known from a single male specimen in 1906 and putative droppings and bite marks throughout the 20th century up to the 2010s. A female individual was rediscovered on the island on an expedition in 2019 for the Animal Planet show Extinct or Alive.
 Voeltzkow's chameleon (Furcifer voeltzkowi)

Birds
 Antioquia brushfinch (Atlapetes blancae)
 Bahia tapaculo (Eleoscytalopus psychopompus)
 Banggai crow (Corvus unicolor), not recorded since 1884/1885, confirmed with a photograph in 2008.
 Beck's petrel (Pseudobulweria beckii), not seen between 1929 and 2007.
 Berlepsch's parotia (Parotia berlepschi)
 Bermuda petrel or "cahow" (Pterodroma cahow), thought extinct since 1620 until 18 nesting pairs were found in 1951 on an uninhabited rock outcropping in Bermuda. Bermudian David B. Wingate has devoted his life to bringing the birds back, and in the 2011-12 breeding season they passed 100-pairs.
 Grand Comoro scops-owl (Otus pauliani)
 Black-browed babbler (Malacocincla perspicillata)
 Black-naped pheasant pigeon (Otidiphaps nobilis insularis), not seen from 1882 to 2022
 Blue-eyed ground dove (Columbina cyanopis)
 Bruijn's brush-turkey (Aepypodius bruijnii)
 Cebu flowerpecker (Dicaeum quadricolor)
Chinese crested tern (Thalasseus bernsteini), feared extinct in the mid-late 20th century for over 6 decades until a small breeding colony was found in 2000.
 Cone-billed tanager (Conothraupis mesoleuca), undetected from 1938 to 2003, but rediscovered in gallery forest in Emas National Park.
 Cuban kite (Chondrohierax wilsonii), confirmed with a photograph in 2009.
 Dusky starfrontlet (Coeligena orina)
 Edwards's pheasant (Lophura edwardii), a Vietnamese pheasant presumed extinct from 1928 until it was rediscovered in 1998.
 Fiji petrel (Pseudobulweria macgillivrayi), first rediscovered on land in 1983, and at sea in 2009.
 Forest owlet (Heteroglaux blewitti), assumed extinct in the 19th century, but rediscovered in central India in 1997.
 Fuertes's parrot (Hapalopsittaca fuertesi)
 Golden-fronted bowerbird (Amblyornis flavifrons)
 Green broadbill (Calyptomena viridis), it was declared extinct since 1941 but it was rediscovered in June 27, 2021.
 Gurney's pitta (Hydrornis gurneyi)
 Ivory-billed woodpecker (Campephilus principalis), the "Lord God Bird", thought extinct circa 1987 before unconfirmed sightings in 1999, 2004, and 2006 in Arkansas and Florida.
 Jerdon's courser (Rhinoptilus bitorquatus), a wader from India, assumed extinct until 1986.
 Kaempfer's woodpecker (Celeus obrieni), a Brazilian woodpecker feared extinct after no specimen had been found since its discovery in 1926. Rediscovered in 2006.
 Kakapo
 Large-billed reed-warbler (Acrocephalus orinus), a warbler rediscovered in Thailand in 2006, previous known only from a specimen collected in India in 1867.
 Long-legged warbler (Trichocichla rufa)
 Madagascar serpent eagle (Eutriorchis astur), rediscovered in 1993, sixty years since the previous sighting.
 Madagascar pochard (Aythya innotata), thought extinct since 1991 until a small group were spotted in 2006.
 Myanmar Jerdon's babbler (Chrysomma altirostre altirostre), last seen in 1941, rediscovered in 2015.
 New Zealand storm-petrel (Oceanites maorianus), believed extinct from 1850 but sighted again in 2003.
 Night parrot (Pezoporus occidentalis), extremely rare Australian bird presumed extinct from the 1880s until 1990.
 Noisy scrub-bird (Atrichornis clamosus)
 São Tomé fiscal (Lanius newtoni)
 São Tomé grosbeak (Neospiza concolor)
 Short-tailed albatross (Phoebastria albatrus)
 Silvery pigeon (Columba argentina), confirmed photographically in 2008.
 Stresemann's bristlefront (Merulaxis stresemanni)
 Táchira antpitta (Grallaria chthonia), a Venezuelan antpitta feared extinct since its discovery in 1956, but rediscovered in 2017 in El Tamá National Park.
 Takahe (Porphyrio hochstetteri), assumed extinct in 1898 but found again in 1948.
 Utila chachalaca (Ortalis vetula deschauenseei), subspecies of the plain chachalaca from Honduras, not recorded between 1963 and 2000 and confirmed photographically in 2005.
 White-winged guan (Penelope albipennis)
 White-collared kite (Leptodon forbesi)
 Worcester's buttonquail (Turnix worcesteri)
 Yellow-eared parrot (Ognorhynchus icterotis)
 Zapata rail (Cyanolimnas cerverai)

Molluscs
 Discus guerinianus, a Madeiran land snail thought extinct in 1996 but found again in 1999.
 Greater Bermuda land snail (Poecilozonites bermudensis), last recorded sighting made in the early 1970s, survey in 1988 and studies in 2000, 2002, and 2004 seemed to confirm extinction, rediscovered in City of Hamilton alleyway in 2014.
 Elliptio nigella (recovery pearly mussel)
 Endodonta christenseni
 Medionidus walkeri
 Campanile

Discussions 
Because its definition is ambiguous, some, like R. B. Rickards and A. J. Wright, reject the very concept of the Lazarus taxon. Rickards and Wright have questioned the usefulness of the concept, writing in "Lazarus taxa, refugia and relict faunas: evidence from graptolites" that anyone could argue that any gap in the fossil record could potentially be considered a Lazarus effect because the duration required for the Lazarus effect is not defined. They have argued that accurate plotting of biodiversity changes and species abundance through time, coupled with an appraisal of their palaeobiogeography, is more important than using this title to categorize species.

Communication and education 
The lack of public engagement around environmental issues has led conservationists to attempt newer communication strategies. One of them is the focus on positive messages, of which Lazarus species are an important part. One conservation outreach project that has focused exclusively on species rediscoveries is the Lost & Found project which aims to tell the stories of species once thought extinct but that were subsequently rediscovered.

See also

 Elvis taxon
 List of fossil sites (with link directory)
 Lists of extinct animals
 Living fossil
 Signor–Lipps effect
 Transitional fossil
 Zombie taxon

References

1983 neologisms
Conservation biology
Phylogenetics
Ecology
Gaps in the fossil record